The Fortress site of Gyeongsang Jwasuyeong is located in Suyeong-dong, Suyeong-gu, Busan Metropolitan City, the Republic of Korea.
The Fortress site of Jwasuyeong is the site of the main fortress of the Gyeongsangjwado naval forces during the Joseon period. At one time, seven naval ports with a total of 65 battle ships and 40 auxiliary vessels were under its command and charged with the defense of the east coast area. 

The command post was first located at Busanpo, then relocated at Gaeunpo at Ulsan, and immediately before the Japanese Invasions of 1592, was moved to this place. It was moved to Gammanipo during the reign of King Injo, and moved back here in 1652, the third year of the reign of King Hyojong. Thereafter, it remained at this site, until the naval forces were disbanded in the overall reformation of the military systems in 1895. 

The time of the original construction of the wall-fortress here is not known, but the wall-fortress to which the existing remains belong seems to have been built after the relocation of the headquarters to this place in 1652. At that time, the wall-fortress was 2,784 meters in circumference and 4 meters in height. It had three wells, four gates, four drain-outlets and a number of small bulwarks along the wall. 

Most of the facilities have been ruined due to the lack of proper care during the colonial period(1910-45) and there remain only parts of the wall, the arched south gate, and drain-outlets.

Castles in South Korea